Jörg Schmall (born 27 January 1943) is a German sailor. He won a bronze medal in the Tornado class with Jörg Spengler at the 1976 Summer Olympics in Montreal.

References 
 

1943 births
Living people
Sportspeople from Stuttgart
German male sailors (sport)
Olympic sailors of West Germany
Olympic bronze medalists for West Germany
Olympic medalists in sailing
Medalists at the 1976 Summer Olympics
Sailors at the 1976 Summer Olympics – Tornado
Tornado class world champions
World champions in sailing for Germany